

Players

Competitions

Division Four

League table

Results summary

League position by match

Matches

FA Cup

League Cup

Appearances and goals

References

Books

1975-76
Northampton Town